The Primetime Emmy Award for Outstanding Voice-Over Performance is a Creative Arts Emmy Award given out by the Academy of Television Arts & Sciences. It is awarded to a performer for an outstanding "continuing or single voice-over performance in a series or a special." Prior to 1992, voice-actors could be nominated for their performance in the live action acting categories. The award was first given in 1992 when six voice actors from The Simpsons shared the award. From 1992 to 2008, it was a juried award, so there were no nominations and there would be multiple or no recipients in one year. In 2009, the rules were changed to a category award, with five nominees.

Usually, the winner is a voice actor from an animated show, but some narrators of live action shows have won such as Keith David in 2005 and 2008. No winner was named in 1996 or 2007.

Nine voice actors from The Simpsons have won a combined 14 Emmys. Of those, Dan Castellaneta has won four and Hank Azaria has won three. Ja'net Dubois has won two for The PJs, Keith David has won two for his narration of various documentaries and Maurice LaMarche has won two for Futurama. Voice actors from shows on Fox have won 17 of 27 awards.

In 2014, the category was separated into two categories – Outstanding Narrator and Outstanding Character Voice-Over Performance. As with longform and reality, this split acknowledges and accommodates a general industry uptrend in the distinctly different achievements that are VO narration and VO character performance.

Rules
While most of the Primetime Emmy Awards choose winners from a group of nominees, the award for Outstanding Voice-Over Performance was juried from 1992 to 2008. Each entrant was screened by a panel of Academy of Television Arts and Sciences members from the Animation branch as well as members of the Acting branch with voiceover credits. Potential nominees had to submit a DVD that contained an edited version of a single episode and a picture of the character(s) that were voiced. Submissions that were less than 30 minutes had to be edited to be shorter than five minutes; entries longer than 30 minutes were edited to be less than ten. Prior to 2007, the maximum edited lengths were ten and fifteen minutes respectively. Each entrant with majority approval went on to a second panel. Emmy winners had to be unanimous choices of this second panel, except that for every 12 persons or fraction thereof on the panel, one "no" vote was allowed, except from the head of the panel.

In 2009, the Academy changed the award from a "juried" award to a "category", with six nominees and one winner.

Winners (1992–2008)

Winners and nominations (2009–2013)

Multiple wins
Wins include Outstanding Narrator and Outstanding Character Voice-Over Performance

4 wins
 Hank Azaria
 Dan Castellaneta
 Seth Macfarlane

3 wins
 David Attenborough
 Keith David

2 wins
 Ja'net Dubois
 Jeremy Irons
 Maurice Lamarche
 Maya Rudolph

References

External links
 Advanced Primetime Awards database

Awards established in 1992
Primetime Emmy Awards
Voice acting awards
Awards disestablished in 2013
Retired Primetime Emmy Awards